Noksen Assembly constituency is one of the 60 Legislative Assembly constituencies of Nagaland state in India. It is part of Tuensang District and is reserved for candidates belonging to the Scheduled Tribes.

It was the first assembly seat in India, where Voter-verified paper audit trail (VVPAT) system was first used with EVMs in a by-poll in September 2013. In October 2013, Supreme Court of India gave a landmark judgement directing Election Commission of India to use VVPAT system for vote validation in phased manner in all subsequent elections in India.

Members of the Legislative Assembly

Election results

2021 by-election 
H. Chuba Chang of the Nationalist Democratic Progressive Party was declared the winner unopposed, on 3 April 2020 since he was the only candidate to file his nomination papers.

2018 
}}

2013 by-election
The by-elections happened on 4 September 2013. The polling percentage was 70.3. Noksen constituency has 12,074 voters, including 6,142 men and 5,832 women, with 21 polling stations spread over 19 villages. 42 VVPAT machines were used during the by-election. Congress fielded Lima Onen Chang as its candidate for the by-poll. C M Chang won the by-election by a margin of 2,863 votes. Chang has to vacate his assembly seat earlier to remain as Lok Sabha MP till the by-election is held for Noksen to avoid parliamentary by-election in Nagaland.

2013
C. M. Chang of Nagaland People's Front was elected as MLA from Noksen(ST) seat in February 2013. The by-election to Noksen assembly constituency was necessitated following resignation of Minister for School Education C. M. Chang on 14 March 2013.

2008
H. Chuba of Indian National Congress won the Noksen seat defeating C. M. Chang of Nagaland People's Front by a margin of 83 votes.

See also
List of constituencies of the Nagaland Legislative Assembly
Tuensang district
 Nagaland (Lok Sabha constituency)
 Mokokchung
 2013 Mizoram Legislative Assembly election
 2013 Nagaland Legislative Assembly election

References

Tuensang district
Assembly constituencies of Nagaland